Veena Verma (born 2 September 1960) is a UK-based Punjabi short-story writer and poet from Punjab, India.

Early life 

Verma was born to a Khatri family, and married to Sunyara family in Budhlada village of Bathinda district (now falls under Mansa district) of the state of Punjab, India. She studied at Budhlada and, after completing her study, she settled in UK.

Career 

She was very fond of writing since her childhood. She writes mostly on women's problems of Asian community. Her first anthology of stories, Mull Di Teeveen, was published in 1992. Till now, she has published three anthologies of stories including Mull Di Teeveen, Firangian Di Noonh (2002), Jogian Di Dhee (2009) and one poetic, Jee Kardai. Some of her stories like Firangian Di Noonh, Gulbano, Khali Plot, Sachchi Saanj and Chhoti Sardarni have been played on stage and been filmed by TV channels.

References 

Punjabi-language writers
Punjabi-language poets
1960 births
Living people
People from Mansa district, India